Shakeel Ahmed may refer to:

 Shakeel Ahmed (cricketer, born 1966), former Pakistani Test cricketer
 Shakeel Ahmed (cricketer, born 1971), former Pakistani Test cricketer
 Shakeel Ahmed (field hockey) (born 1970), Indian field hockey player
 Shakeel Ahmed (scientist), Scientist

See also
 Shakil Ahmed (disambiguation)